The 1868 Melbourne Cup was a two-mile handicap horse race which took place on Thursday, 5 November 1868.

This year was the eighth running of the Melbourne Cup.

This is the list of placegetters for the 1868 Melbourne Cup.

See also

 Melbourne Cup
 List of Melbourne Cup winners
 Victoria Racing Club

References

External links
1868 Melbourne Cup footyjumpers.com

1868
Melbourne Cup
Melbourne Cup
19th century in Melbourne
1860s in Melbourne